Gustavo Ariel Abregú (born 4 July 1997) is an Argentine professional footballer who plays as a centre-back for San Martín.

Career
Abregú's career began with San Martín. He was selected in three fixtures during the 2016 Torneo Federal A, which ended with promotion to Primera B Nacional. Two campaigns later, San Martín were promoted to the Argentine Primera División; though Abregú had only featured once in the prior two seasons. Abregú made his bow in the Primera División against Gimnasia y Esgrima in September 2018.

Personal life
Abregú's brother, César, is also a footballer; he too played for San Martín.

Career statistics
.

Honours
San Martín
Torneo Federal A: 2016

References

External links

1997 births
Living people
Sportspeople from Tucumán Province
Argentine footballers
Association football defenders
Torneo Federal A players
Primera Nacional players
Argentine Primera División players
San Martín de Tucumán footballers